Cheng Li-wun (born November 12, 1969) is a Kuomintang Politician, current non-divisional Legislator. The ancestral home is Yunnan, and once served as former spokeswoman for the Kuomintang in the Republic of China.,  Democratic Progressive Party Deputy Director of Youth Department, National Assembly Representative, Speaker of the Executive Yuan, the 7th term non-divisional Legislator, Kuomintang Central Committee Deputy Chief Executive of the Policy Committee, Kuomintang Central Committee Chairman of the Cultural Communication. She was previously a member of the Democratic Progressive Party, but she switched sides, citing disappointment with the DPP.

Personal life
Cheng married her long-time boyfriend Luo Wu-chang in 2011.

References

Living people
1969 births
Politicians of the Republic of China on Taiwan from Taipei
Democratic Progressive Party (Taiwan) politicians
Kuomintang Members of the Legislative Yuan in Taiwan
Members of the 7th Legislative Yuan
Party List Members of the Legislative Yuan
Members of the 10th Legislative Yuan